Qaleh Qazi-ye Olya (also Romanized as Qal‘eh Qāẕī-ye ‘Olyā) is a village in Gurani Rural District, Gahvareh District, Dalahu County, Kermanshah Province, Iran. At the 2006 census, its population was 33, in 7 families.

References 

Populated places in Dalahu County